Concepts for describing aspects of nature by numbers are called physical quantities. Examples may range from counting fruit to reading a thermometer gauge to determine temperature.

Acquiring such a number, a set of such numbers or related numbers directly from a natural system is called measurement. Examples include counting fruit or using a ruler to measure length.

Often the concepts or ideas that define physical quantities offer themselves straightforward (time, length, ...). To directly assess the value or number of a physical quantity usually proves difficult when very small or very large values are to be measured or when one intends to obtain a high precision measurement. Again examples indicate actual proceedings: In practice, larger amounts of fruit won't be counted but sold by weight. Distances between villages may be measured by counting the rotations of a Surveyor's wheel. Thus this instrument has to be gauged to yield the proper number indicating the distance with respect to some reference.

Furthermore, there may exist innate properties of the natural phenomena that require special attention: Within the thermodynamics-related view on nature, the measurement of entropy could produce entropy itself. Measurements in domains of quantum theory are said to influence the measured quantity significantly.

Skilled devising of measurement methods and measurement instruments allows to circumvent these problems and nevertheless acquire useful data.

A measuring principle condenses the essentials of a method or an instrument for gaining the desired numbers.

Counting integers
An elementary measurement method. Used by humans without any device. And realized by mechanical and electronic automatons.

Dividing/multiplying integers -- Relating to a standard
Also an elementary measurement method. Multiples and fractions of a given standard value are related to an unknown value until its number of relation to the standard value is found.

Runtime measurement
This method uses the timing of reflected signals of a known velocity for measuring lengths. See also the images above.

Integration — Summation
When rates of a physical quantity are readily accessible along some time-interval, integration over time becomes feasible to get the value of the physical quantity.

Impulse excitation technique
A small mechanical impulse causes a solid sample to vibrate. The vibration depends on elastic properties, density, geometry and inner structures (lattice or fissures). Some of these properties may be quantified others detected.

Comparing or/and fitting pre-calculated data
Mathematical models of the physical process (scattering, emission, absorption) allow to calculate expected data (spectra and diffraction pattern). The expected data can be compared with or fitted to the experimental data. 
 X-ray crystallography
 Infrared spectroscopy

Identifying density differences via buoyancy difference 
For the current purposes characterize a body by mass and volume (mass divided by volume gives the mass density of the body). In a gravitational (or other body force) field, and in a vacuum,  the body experiences a transfer of momentum giving its weight. If the vacuum is substituted by a medium (water, air), then the body loses the weight of the displaced medium's volume (otherwise that volume of medium replaced into the remaining medium would not remain force-free). Reconsider the body and the body's volume made up by medium: Subtracting the respective vacuum-weights (body minus medium) gives the resultant, effective, net-weight of the body in the medium.
Thus, any body immersed in a medium will show a weight smaller than its own vacuum-weight. Bodies with densities smaller than that of the medium will have a negative effective weight and experience a net pull against the force field. (The negative vacuum-weight of the medium is called buoyancy. Buoyancy can reduce the net-weight and even make it negative, causing objects to swim on the surface of the medium, like ships do on water.)

In a gravitational force field, in a vacuum, a pair of scales, balanced, shows that the samples have the same weight. If the volumes differ, so will the mass densities.  When immersed in some fluid like air or water, different densities will experience different  buoyancy-forces, because the displaced fluid amounts have the same density, but different volumes. And thus the scales will come out of balance.

The relation between sample and fluid densities, using the equality of the sample masses, allows to calculate one missing density value.
 Dasymeter

See also 
 Measurement
 Measurement instruments

Measurement